The Fountain of Age is a book written by Betty Friedan, who also wrote The Feminine Mystique.  It is a study of aging and how people face aging.

External links
Booknotes interview with Friedan on Fountain of Age, November 28, 1993.

Geriatrics